Baron Charles-Joseph Christiani (27 February 17726 April 1840) was a French Army Maréchal de camp who served during the Napoleonic Wars.

Career
Born in Strasbourg, Christiani was originally a private in the French Revolutionary Army and rose to high rank during the Napoleonic Wars (1803–1815). He was promoted to colonel on 5June and particularly distinguished himself at the 1809 Battle of Wagram and on the 14February 1810 Napoleon created him a baron. On 30August 1813 he was promoted to Brigadier general.

During the 1814 campaign in north-east France at the Battle of Bar-sur-Aube on 27February 1814, Christiani, at the head of a division of the Old Guard, attacked and drove back the Austrians and routed the troops of General Kleist. This feat of arms is quoted by Napoleon in his letters to the Empress. Christiani then defended Montmartre during the 1814 Battle of Paris against troops of the Sixth Coalition.

He died at Montargis in north-central France on 6April 1840.

Decorations
Legion of Honour
Légionnaire (25 prairial XII year)
Officier (7 May 1811)
Commandant (17 May 1813)
Grand officier de la Légion d'honneur (17 May 1813)

Legacy
The Rue Christiani in the 18th arrondissement of Paris is named after him.

Arms

References

1772 births
1840 deaths
Military personnel from Strasbourg
French commanders of the Napoleonic Wars
Barons of the First French Empire
Grand Officiers of the Légion d'honneur
Names inscribed under the Arc de Triomphe